Taylor Leier (born February 15, 1994) is a Canadian professional ice hockey player who is currently playing for the Straubing Tigers of the Deutsche Eishockey Liga (DEL). He was drafted in the fourth round, 117th overall, at the 2012 NHL Entry Draft by the Philadelphia Flyers.

Playing career
Leier began his major junior hockey career in the Western Hockey League with the Portland Winterhawks who drafted him 24th overall in the 2009 WHL Bantam Draft. While playing with the Winterhawks, Leier was drafted 117th overall by the Philadelphia Flyers in the 2012 NHL Entry Draft.

Leier signed a three-year entry-level contract with the Flyers on September 9, 2013. He made his NHL debut against the Carolina Hurricanes on November 14, 2015.

During the 2016–17 season, Leier scored his first NHL goal with the Flyers on December 17, 2016, against the Dallas Stars. He was later returned to the Phantoms and represented Lehigh Valley at the 2017 AHL All-Star Game where he was awarded MVP of the game. In July 2017, he signed a 1-year, two-way, $807,000 contract extension with the Flyers. On July 15, 2018, after Leier applied for arbitration, he signed a one-year deal with the Flyers worth $720,000.

After attending Flyers training camp prior to the 2018–19 season, Leier was a late roster cut and was loaned to the Phantoms on October 2. On January 17, 2019, Leier was traded to the Buffalo Sabres for Justin Bailey. Immediately assigned to AHL affiliate, the Rochester Americans, Leier tallied 12 goals and 23 points in 35 games to close out the campaign.

On June 28, 2019, Leier opted to continue his tenure with the Americans, agreeing to a one-year AHL contract. During the 2019–20 season, Leier returned from injury scoring 7 goals in 17 games with the Americans, before securing a one-year, two-way NHL contract for the remainder of the season with parent affiliate, the Buffalo Sabres on February 17, 2020.

As a free agent from the Americans, Leier belatedly opted to extend his career in Europe, signing mid-season in to the 2020–21 campaign with Czech club, HC Oceláři Třinec of the ELH, on January 3, 2021. His contract with Oceláři Třinec was terminated at the end of January after playing 10 games with the team. On February 2, 2021, Leier signed with Adler Mannheim in the Deutsche Eishockey Liga for the remainder of the 2020–21 season.

On August 26, 2021, Leier signed with the Straubing Tigers, also of the DEL, alongside other former Flyers Jason Akeson and Brandon Manning.

Personal life
Leier grew up in Saskatchewan with parents Tim and Cindy Leier and younger brother Keaton. Keaton is a professional ballet dancer with the Atlanta Ballet.

Career statistics

Regular season and playoffs

International

References

External links
 

1994 births
Living people
Adler Mannheim players
Canadian ice hockey left wingers
Ice hockey people from Saskatchewan
Lehigh Valley Phantoms players
HC Oceláři Třinec players
Philadelphia Flyers draft picks
Philadelphia Flyers players
Portland Winterhawks players
Rochester Americans players
Sportspeople from Saskatoon
Straubing Tigers players
Canadian expatriate ice hockey players in the Czech Republic
Canadian expatriate ice hockey players in the United States
Canadian expatriate ice hockey players in Germany